Morocco competed at the 2016 Summer Paralympics in Rio de Janeiro, Brazil, from 7 to 18 September 2016.

Disability classifications

Every participant at the Paralympics has their disability grouped into one of five disability categories; amputation, the condition may be congenital or sustained through injury or illness; cerebral palsy; wheelchair athletes, there is often overlap between this and other categories; visual impairment, including blindness; Les autres, any physical disability that does not fall strictly under one of the other categories, for example dwarfism or multiple sclerosis. Each Paralympic sport then has its own classifications, dependent upon the specific physical demands of competition. Events are given a code, made of numbers and letters, describing the type of event and classification of the athletes competing. Some sports, such as athletics, divide athletes by both the category and severity of their disabilities, other sports, for example swimming, group competitors from different categories together, the only separation being based on the severity of the disability.

Medalists
Morocco's medal haul was more than the total earned by Morocco's 2016 Olympic team who came away with one bronze medal, earned in men's football. They finished thirty third overall on the medal table. 

The following Moroccan competitors won medals at the Games. In the 'by discipline' sections below, medalists' names are in bold.

Athletics

Men

Track

Field

Women

Track

Field

5-a-side football 

Morocco qualified for the Paralympics after finishing second at the 2015 IBSA Blind Football African Championships in Douala, Cameroon. In the first round of group play, Morocco beat Egypt 3 - 0.  The second round saw Morocco beat Senegal 3 - 0.  This qualified them through first in their group, where they met Mali in the semi-final.  They won that game 1 - 0.  Morocco then met hosts Cameroon in the final, which Morocco won 2 - 0.  

7th–8th place match

Paratriathlon

Powerlifting

See also
Morocco at the 2016 Summer Olympics

References

Nations at the 2016 Summer Paralympics
2016
2016 in Moroccan sport